Rivière Noire or Black River is a district on the western side of the island of Mauritius. Rivière Noire translates to Black River. This region receives less rainfall than the others. It is the third largest District of Mauritius in area, but the smallest in terms of population. The district is mostly rural, but it also include the western part of the city of Port Louis and western part of Quatre Bornes.

History
Riviere Noire has a big hindu population and has many temples.

Places of interest 

Famous areas include Tamarin Falls and the Chamarel coloured earth.
The name Black River derives from the fact that it is the driest district of the island. Flic en Flac is one of the most beautiful beaches on the island, and the longest. It is known for its natural beauty.

Places
The Rivière Noire District includes different regions; however, some regions are further divided into different suburbs.

 Albion
 Bambous
 Cascavelle (Eastern part in Plaines Wilhems District)
 Case Noyale
 Chamarel (Eastern part in Savanne District)
 Flic-en-Flac
 Grande-Rivière-Noire
 Gros-Cailloux
 La Gaulette
 Le Morne
 Petite-Rivière
 Port Louis (West)
 Quatre Bornes (West)
 Richelieu
 Tamarin

Education

Schools:
 École maternelle et primaire Paul et Virginie, a French international school, is in Tamarin.
 La Gaulette State Secondary School, a state school providing co-education in La Gaulette Village

See also
 Districts of Mauritius
 List of places in Mauritius

References 

 
Districts of Mauritius